Gossa may refer to:

Places
 Gossa (island), an island in Møre og Romsdal county, Norway
 Gossa, Germany, a former municipality in Saxony-Anhalt, Germany

See also 
 Gossas, a town in Fatick Region in western Senegal
 Hossa (disambiguation)